Pentti Vihtori Holappa (11 August 1927 – 10 October 2017) was a Finnish poet, writer and politician. Born in Ylikiiminki to a relatively poor family of modest means, he held numerous jobs before becoming a political journalist and eventually obtaining a government post.  He was self-educated, but produced around fifteen volumes of poetry, as well as several novels and essays.  He also worked as a translator; among the poets and authors whose work he translated into Finnish are Charles Baudelaire, Pierre Reverdy, and J. M. G. Le Clézio.  He received the Finlandia Prize in 1998 for his novel Ystävän muotokuva: Portrait of a Friend.

Between February and October 1972, Holappa was Minister of Culture and Education in the Paasio II Cabinet representing the Social Democratic Party of Finland.

Bibliography
 Long Words: Poems 1950–1994 (1997)
 Ystävän muotokuva: Portrait of a Friend

References

External links
Website.
His work on Poezibao.

1927 births
2017 deaths
People from Oulu
Writers from Northern Ostrobothnia
20th-century Finnish poets
Finnish male novelists
Finnish essayists
Finnish translators
Finlandia Prize winners
Finnish male poets
Finnish LGBT poets
Finnish LGBT novelists
Finnish LGBT politicians
Gay poets
Gay novelists
Gay politicians
20th-century essayists
20th-century Finnish novelists
Social Democratic Party of Finland politicians
Government ministers of Finland
20th-century male writers
20th-century translators